Shawtown is an unincorporated community located in the Lillington Township of Harnett County, North Carolina,  United States, on the southern side of the town of Lillington. It is a part of the Dunn Micropolitan Area, which is also a part of the greater Raleigh–Durham–Cary Combined Statistical Area (CSA) as defined by the United States Census Bureau.

References 

GNIS Shawtown
GNIS Former Shawtown Highschool

Unincorporated communities in Harnett County, North Carolina
Unincorporated communities in North Carolina